Jean Royère (1902–1981) was a French designer.

Biography 
In 1931, aged 29, Jean Royère resigned from a comfortable position in the import-export trade in order to set up business as an interior designer. He learned his new trade in the cabinetmaking workshops of the Faubourg Saint-Antoine in Paris. In 1934, he signed the new layout of the Brasserie Carlton on the Champs-Élysées and found immediate success. This was the beginning of an international career that was to last until the early 1970s. He also designed the interior for the Hôtel Saint-Georges in Beirut, Lebanon.  A key figure of the avant-garde in the 1950s, Royère tackled all kinds of decoration work and opened branches in the Near East and Latin America. Among his patrons were King Farouk, King Hussein of Jordan, and the Shah of Iran, who were captivated by his freedom of creation and his elegance and entrusted him with the layout of their palaces. Royère pioneered an original style combining bright colors, organic forms and precious materials within a wide range of imaginative accomplishments. In 1980, he left France for the United States, where he lived until his death.

Bibliography 

 Françoise-Claire Prodhon, Jean Royère, éditions Galerie Patrick Seguin & Galerie Jacques Lacoste, Paris, 2012
 Patrick Favardin, Les Décorateurs des années 50, Norma éditions, Paris, 2002
 Pierre-Emmanuel Martin-Vivier, Jean Royère, Norma éditions, Paris, 2002
 Jean-Luc Olivie, Jean Royère, décorateur à Paris, Norma éditions, Paris, 1999
 Jean Royère " Cheminées et coins de feu ", Éditions d'Art Charles Moreau, Paris, c. 1950

External links 
  Jean Royère in the collections of the Musée des Arts décoratifs

References 

1902 births
1981 deaths
French designers